Anjunabeats Volume Four is the fourth album in the Anjunabeats Volume compilation series mixed and compiled by British trance group Above & Beyond released on 3 July 2006.

Track listing

References

External links 
 

2006 compilation albums
Above & Beyond (band) albums
Anjunabeats compilation albums
Sequel albums
Electronic compilation albums